was a Japanese transport ship that was sunk by  on 25 February 1944. Nearly 5,000 people died.

See also 
List by death toll of ships sunk by submarines
Imperial Japanese Army Railways and Shipping Section
Foreign commerce and shipping of Empire of Japan

References

Maritime incidents in February 1944
Ships sunk by American submarines
World War II shipwrecks in the Pacific Ocean